Elhadi Adam Elhadi, or Al-Hadi Adam Al-Hadi (1927-30 November 2006), was a Sudanese poet and song writer born in El-Helalelih village, Al Jazirah state in central Sudan on the bank of the Blue Nile. He is buried in Sheikh Mahgoub Cemetery in northern Khartoum.

Career
He joined Al-mahad Al-elaamy or Institute (now Omdurman Islamic University) in Omdurman and after he graduated he worked in many Sudanese newspapers. He later received a scholarship to complete his education in Egypt in Dar Al-eloom or the Housing of Science in Cairo; he received a diploma in Education and psychology from Ain Shams University in Cairo and then returned to Sudan and worked as a teacher in many Sudanese towns. One of his poems, called El-Helalelieaa, was a part of the curriculum in intermediate school. The poem talks about his homeland, El-Helalelieaa village, and how he is suffering from nostalgia for his village.
Elhadi became well known in Sudan and in Arab world when his poem (Aghadan Algak) Is It Tomorrow we shall meet? was sung by the pioneer Egyptian singer Umm Kulthum. The poem was selected by the diva Umm Kulthum among tens of poems offered to her during her visit to Sudan in 1968. She was delayed to singing this song written by Al-Hadi because of the death of Gamal Abdel Nasser, but later sang it in May 1971 on stage of the Cinema "Giser en-nīl" or Nile Palace, which was composed by Egyptian composer Muhammed Abdelwahab.
 
Elhadi Adam is considered by critics as one of the greatest poets not only of Sudan but of the Arab world as well. Even though he belonged to the old school of poets, he is still considered contemporary.
 
Al-Hadi Adam was a prolific writer and has several collections of poems. The most well known of his work is (Koukh Al-Ashwag)  (mid 1960s), which is considered by critics to be the best of his work. Al-Hadi Adam wrote in several fields, and he wrote one play named Suad which calls against early marriage. 
Critics and history scholars in Sudan believe he is one of those who contributed toward the development of poetry, through the arts association, which he supervised in the schools he worked in throughout Sudan. Also he had two poetry collection Nowafez Al`adam , `Affoan Ayohha Al-mostaheel عفوا أيها.

Sample of his poems which translated to English
 I Won't Pass Away

What would happen
had my life ended.
And my heart beat stopped.
With my soul flying.
Throughout the sky as an eagle.
Do you think life would keep up noisy.
And –as I used to know- with its system perfectly running.
Or a disaster would hit the globeAnd take it away for a while?!

Nothing, but it will be full.
Of pleasures and all forms of temptation.
Many will go on playing.
Awaiting the emergence of dawn.
Loudly repeating the melody.
Telling the flowers about the morning.
And a true brother of mine.
Keep remembering me
Maintaining our old friendship.

I know what will be said tomorrow.
And I will ridicule it from within my grave.
They will say –when I die- passed away
Made the (president) contented, and bestowed his life!

The source of this translation may be found at

References
https://web.archive.org/web/20070926235936/http://www.albabtainprize.org/PoemDetails.aspx?pmId=1291&ptId=720
http://www.diwanalarab.com/spip.php?article7011
 :ar:الهادي آدم
http://zeinkim.blogspot.com/2006/12/blog-post_16.html
http://alsudani.info/index.php?type=3&id=2147510052
http://basheerayyad.maktoobblog.com/?preDate=2006-12-17%2022:16:00&post=163767
http://www.alsahafa.info/index.php?type=6&issue_id=1152&col_id=25&bk=1
https://web.archive.org/web/20071007160633/http://www.d-alyasmen.com/vb1/show.php?MainID=18&SubjectID=1124
http://www.sol-sd.com/news/122/ARTICLE/1552/2006-12-03.html
http://www.sudanese.net/lofiversion/index.php/t54833.html

20th-century Sudanese poets
1927 births
2006 deaths
Ain Shams University alumni
Omdurman Islamic University alumni
21st-century Sudanese poets